Benton Springs may refer to:

Benton Springs, Tennessee, an unincorporated community
Benton Springs Fault, a geological fault in Nevada

See also
Benton Hot Springs, California